= Alois Pogatscher =

Austrian philologist (1852–1935)

Alois Pogatscher (born April 17, 1852, in Graz, died December 14, 1935, in the same place) was an Austrian philologist of English. His doctoral thesis was described in 2000 as "Die bislang umfassendste Arbeit zum Lehnwortschatz des Altenglishen" ('the most comprehensive work to date on the loan-vocabulary of Old English').

== Life ==
The son of a master metalsmith, Pogatscher studied classical philology and German studies at the University of Graz from 1871 to 1873, and German, Romance studies and English studies at the University of Vienna from 1873. After receiving his doctorate at the University of Strasbourg in 1889, he became a professor in Graz in 1908.

== Major works ==
=== Author ===
- Zur Volksetymologie. Nachträge und Bemerkungen zu Andresens und Palmers Volksetymologischen Schriften. Graz 1884.
- Zur Lautlehre der griechischen, lateinischen und romanischen Lehnworte im Altenglischen, Quellen und Forschungen zur Sprach- und Kulturgeschichte der germanischen Völker, 64 (Strassburg: Trübner, 1888).

=== Editor ===
- Th. v. Karajans Index zu J. Grimms Deutschen Rechtsalterthümern. Salzburg 1877, OCLC 10426119.
- with Edward Adolf Sonnenschein: Johann Wolfgang von Goethe: Select poems. Edited with life, introductions, and explanatory notes. London 1892.
